Big Mountain, also referred to as Big Mount, is an unincorporated community in York County, Pennsylvania, United States.

References

External links

http://www.yorkblog.com/cannonball/2011/11/27/part-of-old-confederate-campsite-at-big-mount-pa-is-now-an-alpaca-farm/

Unincorporated communities in York County, Pennsylvania
Unincorporated communities in Pennsylvania